Artem Olegovich Vakhitov (born April 4, 1991) is a Russian Muay Thai kickboxer who competes in the cruiserweight and heavyweight divisions. Having begun practicing Muay Thai at eleven years old, Vakhitov first came to prominence due to a successful amateur career by winning three world championships as well as taking gold in 2013 at the World Combat Games and silver in 2010. He turned professional in 2009, and signed with Glory in 2013, where he would twice be crowned the Glory Light Heavyweight (-95 kg/209 lb) champion.

As of September 2022, he is ranked the #1 light-heavyweight and #5 pound-for-pound kickboxer in the world by Combat Press, as well as the #1 light-heavyweight and #3 pound-for-pound kickboxer by Beyond Kick.

Early life
Artem Vakhitov was born in Prokopyevsk on April 4, 1991, and began basic martial arts training under his father's tutelage at the age of five years before going on to study karate at the age of six, which he practiced for five years. He was forced to give up karate aged eleven when he and his family moved to another part of the city, but he soon found the Kuzbass Muay Thai gym where he is trained by Vitaly Miller and is a training partner of Artem Levin. Vakhitov holds the classification of Master of Sports in muay Thai, and is also a classically trained musician.

Career

Amateur
Vakhitov first came to prominence when he won the IFMA Russian Championships in 2008 aged seventeen. Following this, he would go on to win the Russian Championships four more times (2009, 2010, 2011 and 2013), the European Championships four times (2009, 2010, 2011 and 2012) and the World Championships three times (2010, 2011 and 2012).

He also won a silver medal in the -81 kg/178 lb division at the 2010 World Combat Games, held in Beijing, China between August 28 and September 4, 2010. After taking unanimous decision wins over Kim Olsen and Nurbolat Sengirov in the quarter-finals and semis, respectively, he then lost to Simon Marcus by split decision in the final.

Competing in the -91 kg/200 lb division at the 2013 World Combat Games in Saint Petersburg, Russia between October 18 and 26, 2013, Vakhitov outpointed Dzianis Hancharonak in the quarters, TKO'd Thomas Alizier and knocked out Emidio Barone with a knee in the final to take the gold medal.

Professional

Early years
In his first outing as a professional, Vakhitov competed in the Souboj Titánů tournament in Plzeň, Czech Republic on November 21, 2009, and made it to the final where he faced Jiri Zak. The bout was ruled a draw after the regulation three rounds and so it went to an extension round to decide the winner, after which Žák took the judges' decision.

The following year, he entered the Tatneft Cup 2010 at -80 kg/176 lb. After beating Saiseelek Nor-Seepun in the opening round on January 31, 2010, and Yordan Yankov in the quarter-finals on April 30, 2010, both by unanimous decision, Vakhitov then exited the competition when he was defeated by his longtime teammate Artem Levin in the semi-finals on July 29, 2010, retiring in his corner at the end of the third round. He then re-entered the tournament, however, when Levin was unable to fight Alexander Stetsurenko in the final due to injury and Vakhitov was selected as his replacement. In a close match on October 20, 2010, Vakhitov took Stetsurenko into an extension round before losing by UD.

Having signed with the short-lived Muaythai Premier League, Vakhitov made his promotional debut on September 2, 2011, at Muaythai Premier League: Stars and Stripes in Long Beach, California, United States where he rematched Simon Marcus. It was a closely contested affair but Marcus edged ahead by successfully scoring from the clinch with elbows and knees on various occasions to win a unanimous decision. He faced another familiar foe in his sophomore MPL appearance, taking on Jiri Zak at Muaythai Premier League: Blood and Steel in The Hague, Netherlands on November 6, 2011. He avenged his earlier loss to the Czech by winning via unanimous decision.

On December 2, 2011, Vakhitov won his first title as a professional, defeating Vando Cabral via TKO due to a cut caused by an elbow in round three at Battle of Champions 6 in Moscow, Russia to become the WMC European Super Light Heavyweight (-82.55 kg/182 lb) Champion.

He was set to replace Artem Levin in a fight with Joe Schilling for the WBC Muaythai Interim World Light Heavyweight Championship at Battle for the Belts in Bangkok, Thailand on June 9, 2012. He withdrew from the bout, however, after conceding that he would be unable to meet the -79.3 kg/175 lb weight limit and his place was taken by Karapet Karapetyan.

Continuing to move up in weight, Vakhitov beat Alexander Oleynik on points in a -91 kg/200 lb bout at the Alpha Cup in Moscow on May 18, 2013. It was the third meeting between the pair, with Vakhitov defeating Oleynik twice previously in the amateur ranks.

Glory 
Vakhitov signed with Glory shortly after, as a competitor in the kickboxing organization's -95 kg/209 lb light heavyweight division. He gave an impressive performance in his first fight under the Glory banner, scoring an early knockdown over Luis Tavares before finishing him with a liver shot just over a minute into the first round at Glory 9: New York in New York City, New York, US on June 22, 2013.

He defeated fellow amateur standout Nenad Pagonis by unanimous decision at Glory 12: New York in New York City on November 23, 2013.

Vakhitov defeated Igor Jurković via UD at Glory 16: Denver in Broomfield, Colorado, US on May 3, 2014. He rematched Dzianis Hancharonak at Monte Carlo Fighting Masters 2014 in Monte Carlo, Monaco on June 14, 2014, winning by unanimous decision and taking the vacant WMC World Heavyweight (-95.0 kg/209 lb) Championship.

He was expected to fight against Andrei Stoica at Glory 20: Dubai on April 3, 2014. The Romanian withdrew for undisclosed reasons, however, and was replaced by Saulo Cavalari.  Vakhitov lost the fight by split decision.

Vakhitov returned at Glory 25: Milan against Danyo Ilunga and won the fight by unanimous decision and won the opportunity to re-match Saulo Cavalari for the Glory Light Heavyweight championship.

Glory Light heavyweight title reign
Vakhitov successfully re-matched and defeated Saulo Cavalari by unanimous decision at Glory 28: Paris and won the Glory Light Heavyweight championship.

It was announced that Vakhitov would fight light heavyweight title contender Zack Mwekassa at Glory 35: Nice in France.  Vakhitov successfully defended his championship and stopped Mwekassa by knocking him down three times; declaring Vakhitov the winner by TKO.

As his second title defense, Vakhitov was scheduled to rematch Saulo Cavalari at Glory 38: Chicago and dominated the fight, winning by TKO in the second round.

Vakhitov fought and successfully defended his Light Heavyweight championship against Brazilian contender, Ariel Machado at Glory 47: Lyon.  Vakhitov knocked Machado down in the second round with a head kick, but after beating the 10 count, Vakhitov continued to beat Machado and won the fight by unanimous decision.

It was announced that Vakhitov would re-match former opponent Danyo Ilunga at Glory 56: Denver which will mark Vakhitov's fourth title fight in Glory. Vakhitov won the fight by unanimous decision. During the bout he injured his right hand, which kept him out of the ring for nearly a year.

He was scheduled to defend his title, for the fifth time, against Donegi Abena at Glory 66. He won the fight by split decision, although it was considered controversial by some fans. During the fight, Vakhitov once again injured his hand. As the repeated hand injuries kept him limited to just four appearances over the course of 29 months, he underwent surgery to repair the hand in July 2019. He is expected to defend against the interim Glory Light Heavyweight champion Alex Pereira, after he recovers from the surgery.

Second Glory Light heavyweight title reign
Vakhitov was scheduled to make his sixth title defense against the current GLORY Middleweight and interim Light Heavyweight champion Alex Pereira at Glory 77. He lost the fight by split decision.

Due to the close nature of the match, Vakthitov called for a rematch. Glory granted his wish and scheduled the rematch with Pereira for Glory 78: Arnhem  on September 4, 2021. Vakhitov successfully regained the title with a majority decision victory.

Vakhitov was booked to make his first title defense against the #1 light heavyweight contender Luis Tavares at Glory 80 on March 19, 2022. Vakhitov was rescheduled to face Tarik Khbabez in a non-title bout at the same event, after Tavares refused to face him due to the 2022 Russian invasion of Ukraine. Vakhitov withdrew from the bout on March 12.

Glory released Vakhitov from their roster on June 17, 2022, in protest of the 2022 Russian invasion of Ukraine.

Post Glory career
On November 17, 2022, it was announced that Vakhitov had signed with Muaythai Factory. He made his promotional debut against Pascal Toure on February 2, 2023. Vakhitov won the fight by unanimous decision.

Championships and awards

Kickboxing
Glory
2016 Glory Light Heavyweight (-95 kg/209 lb) Championship (five defenses)
2021 Glory Light Heavyweight (-95 kg/209 lb) Championship
Battle of Champions
2014 BOC (-95.5 kg/210 lb) Champion
Tatneft Cup
Tatneft Cup 2010 –80 kg/176 lb Runner-up

Muay Thai
International Federation of Muaythai Amateur
2008 IFMA Russian Championships Gold Medalist 
2009 IFMA Russian Championships Gold Medalist 
2009 IFMA European Championships Gold Medalist 
2010 IFMA Russian Championships Gold Medalist 
2010 IFMA European Championships -81 kg/178 lb gold medalist 
2010 IFMA World Championships -81 kg/178 lb Gold Medalist 
2011 IFMA Russian Championships -86 kg/189 lb gold medalist 
2011 IFMA European Championships -86 kg/189 lb silver medalist 
2011 IFMA World Championships -81 kg/178 lb gold medalist 
2012 IFMA European Championships Gold Medalist 
2012 IFMA World Championships -86 kg/189 lb gold medalist 
2013 IFMA Russian Championships -91 kg/200 lb gold medalist 
2015 IFMA World Championships -91 kg/189 lb gold medalist 
Russian Muay Thai Cup
2009 Russian Muay Thai Cup Gold Medalist 
2010 Russian Muay Thai Cup Gold Medalist 
2011 Russian Muay Thai Cup Gold Medalist 
World Combat Games
2010 World Combat Games -81 kg/178 lb Muay Thai Silver Medalist 
2013 World Combat Games -91 kg/200 lb Muay Thai Gold Medalist 
World Muaythai Council
WMC European Super Light Heavyweight (-82.55 kg/182 lb) Championship
WMC World Heavyweight (-95.0 kg/209 lb) Championship

Fight record
 
|-
|-  style="background:#cfc"
| 2023-02-02|| Win ||align=left| Pascal Toure || Muaythai Factory || Kemerovo, Russia || Decision (unanimous)|| 3 || 3:00 || 23–6
|-
|-  style="background:#cfc"
| 2021-09-04|| Win ||align=left| Alex Pereira || Glory 78: Rotterdam || Rotterdam, Netherlands || Decision (majority) ||5  ||3:00  ||22–6 
|-
! style=background:white colspan=9 |
|-  style="background:#fbb;"
| 2021-01-30 || Loss ||align=left| Alex Pereira || Glory 77: Rotterdam || Rotterdam, Netherlands || Decision (split)|| 5 || 3:00 || 21–6
|-
! style=background:white colspan=9 |
|-  style="background:#cfc;"
| 2019-06-22 || Win ||align=left| Donegi Abena || Glory 66: Paris || Paris, France || Decision (split) || 5 || 3:00 || 21–5
|-
! style=background:white colspan=9 |
|-  style="background:#cfc;"
| 2018-08-10 || Win ||align=left| Danyo Ilunga || Glory 56: Denver || Broomfield, Colorado, USA || Decision (unanimous)|| 5 || 3:00 || 20–5
|-
! style=background:white colspan=9 |
|-
|-  style="background:#cfc;"
| 2017-10-28 || Win  ||align=left| Ariel Machado || Glory 47: Lyon || Lyon, France || Decision (unanimous) || 5 || 3:00 || 19–5
|-
! style=background:white colspan=9 |
|-
|-  style="background:#cfc;"
| 2017-02-24 || Win  ||align=left| Saulo Cavalari || Glory 38: Chicago || Hoffman Estates, Illinois, USA || TKO (punches) || 2 || 2:43 || 18–5
|-
! style=background:white colspan=9 |
|-
|-  style="background:#cfc;"
| 2016-11-05 || Win ||align=left| Zack Mwekassa || Glory 35: Nice || Nice, France || TKO (three knockdowns) || 2 || 2:23 || 17–5 
|-
! style=background:white colspan=9 |
|-
|-  style="background:#cfc;"
| 2016-03-12 || Win ||align=left| Saulo Cavalari || Glory 28: Paris || Paris, France || Decision (unanimous) || 5 || 3:00 || 16–5
|-
! style=background:white colspan=9 |
|-  style="background:#cfc;"
| 2015-12-19 || Win ||align=left| Lorenzo Javier Jorge || Muay Thai Moscow || Moscow, Russia || KO (straight left) || 2 || || 15–5
|-  style="background:#cfc;"
| 2015-11-06 || Win ||align=left| Danyo Ilunga || Glory 25: Milan || Monza, Italy || Decision (unanimous)|| 3 || 3:00 || 14–5
|-  style="background:#fbb;"
| 2015-04-03 || Loss ||align=left| Saulo Cavalari || Glory 20: Dubai || Dubai, UAE || Decision (split) || 3 || 3:00 || 13–5
|-
! style=background:white colspan=9 |
|-  style="background:#cfc;"
| 2014-11-21 || Win ||align=left| İbrahim Giydirir || Battle of Champions 7  || Moscow, Russia || Decision (unanimous) || 5 || 3:00 || 13–4
|-
! style=background:white colspan=9 |
|-  style="background:#cfc;"
| 2014-06-14 || Win ||align=left| Dzianis Hancharonak || Monte Carlo Fighting Masters 2014 || Monte Carlo, Monaco || Decision (unanimous) || 5 || 3:00 || 12–4
|-
! style=background:white colspan=9 |
|-  style="background:#cfc;"
| 2014-05-03 || Win ||align=left| Igor Jurković || Glory 16: Denver || Broomfield, Colorado, USA || Decision (unanimous) || 3 || 3:00 || 11–4
|-  style="background:#cfc;"
| 2013-11-23 || Win ||align=left| Nenad Pagonis || Glory 12: New York || New York City, New York, USA || Decision (unanimous) || 3 || 3:00 || 10–4
|-  style="background:#cfc;"
| 2013-06-22 || Win ||align=left| Luis Tavares || Glory 9: New York || New York City, New York, USA || KO (left hook to the body) || 1 || 1:06 || 9–4
|-  style="background:#cfc;"
| 2013-05-18 || Win ||align=left| Alexander Oleinik || Alpha Cup || Moscow, Russia || Decision || 5 || 3:00 || 8–4
|-  style="background:#cfc;"
| 2011-12-02 || Win ||align=left| Vando Cabral || Battle of Champions 6 || Moscow, Russia || TKO (cut) || 3 || || 
|-
! style=background:white colspan=9 |
|-  style="background:#cfc;"
| 2011-11-06 || Win ||align=left| Jiri Zak || Muaythai Premier League: Blood and Steel || The Hague, Netherlands || Decision (unanimous) || 3 || 3:00 || 
|-  style="background:#fbb;"
| 2011-09-02 || Loss ||align=left| Simon Marcus || Muaythai Premier League: Stars and Stripes || Long Beach, California, USA || Decision (unanimous) || 3 || 3:00 || 
|-  style="background:#fbb;"
| 2010-10-20 || Loss ||align=left| Alexander Stetsurenko || Tatneft Cup 2010 Part 7, Final || Kazan, Russia || Extension round decision (unanimous) || 6 || 3:00 || 
|-
! style=background:white colspan=9 |
|-  style="background:#fbb;"
| 2010-07-29 || Loss ||align=left| Artem Levin || Tatneft Cup 2010 Part 6, Semi Finals || Kazan, Russia || Decision (unanimous) || 3 || 3:00 || 
|-  style="background:#cfc;"
| 2010-04-30 || Win ||align=left| Yordan Yankov || Tatneft Cup 2010 Part 4, Quarter Finals || Kazan, Russia || Decision (unanimous) || 4 || 3:00 || 
|-  style="background:#cfc;"
| 2010-01-31 || Win ||align=left| Saiseelek Nor-Seepun || Tatneft Cup 2010 Part 2, First Round || Kazan, Russia || Decision (unanimous) || 4 || 3:00 || 
|-  style="background:#fbb;"
| 2009-11-21 || Loss ||align=left| Jiri Zak || Souboj Titánů, Final || Plzeň, Czech Republic || Extension round decision || 4 || 3:00 || 
|-

|-  style="background:#cfc;"
| 2015-08- || Win ||align=left| Jakob Styben || 2015 IFMA World Championships, Final || Bangkok, Thailand || Decision || 3 || 3:00
|-
! style=background:white colspan=9 |

|-  style="background:#cfc;"
| 2015-08- || Win ||align=left| Oleh Pryimachov || 2015 IFMA World Championships, Semi Final || Bangkok, Thailand || Decision || 3 || 3:00

|-  style="background:#cfc;"
| 2015-08- || Win ||align=left| Dzianis Hancharonak || 2015 IFMA World Championships, Quarter Final || Bangkok, Thailand || Decision || 3 || 3:00

|-  style="background:#cfc;"
| 2013-10-23 || Win ||align=left| Emidio Barone || 2013 World Combat Games -91 kg/200 lb Muay Thai, Final || Saint Petersburg, Russia || KO (knee) || || 
|-
! style=background:white colspan=9 |
|-  style="background:#cfc;"
| 2013-10-21 || Win ||align=left| Thomas Alizier || 2013 World Combat Games -91 kg/200 lb Muay Thai, Semi Finals || Saint Petersburg, Russia || TKO (corner stoppage) || 1 || 
|-  style="background:#cfc;"
| 2013-10-19 || Win ||align=left| Dzianis Hancharonak || 2013 World Combat Games -91 kg/200 lb Muay Thai, Quarter Finals || Saint Petersburg, Russia || Decision || 3 || 3:00
|-  style="background:#cfc;"
| 2013-08-00 || Win ||align=left| Vladimir Mineev || 2013 IFMA Russian Championships, Final || Kemerovo, Russia || TKO (broken nose) || || 
|-
! style=background:white colspan=9 |
|-  style="background:#cfc;"
| 2012-09-13 || Win ||align=left| Sadibou Sy || 2012 IFMA World Championships, Final || Saint Petersburg, Russia || Decision || 4 || 2:00
|-
! style=background:white colspan=9 |

|-  bgcolor="#cfc"
| 2012-09-11 || Win ||align=left| Andrey Gerasimchuk || 2012 IFMA World Championships, Semi Finals|| Saint Petersburg, Russia || Decision ||  || 

|-  style="background:#cfc;"
| 2012-09- || Win ||align=left| Fallah Madji || 2012 IFMA World Championships, Quarter Finals || Saint Petersburg, Russia || TKO (retirement) || 1 || 2:00

|-  style="background:#cfc;"
| 2012-05-23 || Win ||align=left| Alexander Oleinik || 2012 IFMA European Championships -86 kg/189 lb, Final || Antalya, Turkey || Decision || 4 || 2:00
|-
! style=background:white colspan=9 |

|-  style="background:#cfc;"
| 2011-09-27||Win||align=left| Dmitry Abdulin || 2011 IFMA World Championships, Final || Tashkent, Uzbekistan || Decision || 4 || 2:00 
|-
! style=background:white colspan=9 |

|-  style="background:#cfc;"
| 2011-09-25|| Win||align=left| Abdoulie Joof || 2011 IFMA World Championships, Semi Finals || Tashkent, Uzbekistan || Decision || 4 || 2:00 

|-  style="background:#cfc;"
| 2011-09-22|| Win ||align=left| Ali Afzali || 2011 IFMA World Championships, Quarter Finals || Tashkent, Uzbekistan || Decision || 4 || 2:00

|-  style="background:#fbb;"
| 2011-04-00 || Loss||align=left| Andrey Gerasimchuk || 2011 IFMA European Championships -86 kg/189 lb, Final || Antalya, Turkey || Decision || 4 || 2:00
|-
! style=background:white colspan=9 |

|-  style="background:#cfc;"
| 2011-04-00 || Win ||align=left| Alexander Oleinik || 2011 IFMA European Championships -86 kg/189 lb, Semi Finals || Antalya, Turkey || Decision || 4 || 2:00

|-  style="background:#cfc;"
| 2011-04-00 || Win ||align=left| Priest West || 2011 IFMA European Championships -86 kg/189 lb, Quarter Finals || Antalya, Turkey || Decision || 4 || 2:00
|-  style="background:#cfc;"
| 2011-00-00 || Win ||align=left| Ivan Lentka || 2011 IFMA Russian Championships -86 kg/189 lb || Russia || Decision || 4 || 2:00
|-
! style=background:white colspan=9 |

|-  style="background:#cfc;"
| 2010-12- || Win||align=left| Dzmitry Abdulin || 2010 I.F.M.A. World Muaythai Championships, Finals || Bangkok, Thailand || ||||
|-
! style=background:white colspan=9 |
|-  style="background:#cfc;"
| 2010-12- || Win||align=left| || 2010 I.F.M.A. World Muaythai Championships, Semi Finals || Bangkok, Thailand || ||||

|-  style="background:#fbb;"
| 2010-00-00 || Loss ||align=left| Simon Marcus || 2010 World Combat Games -81 kg/178 lb Muay Thai, Final || Beijing, China || Decision (split) || 4 || 2:00
|-
! style=background:white colspan=9 |
|-  style="background:#cfc;"
| 2010-00-00 || Win ||align=left| Nurbolat Sengirov || 2010 World Combat Games -81 kg/178 lb Muay Thai, Semi Finals || Beijing, China || Decision (unanimous) || 4 || 2:00
|-  style="background:#cfc;"
| 2010-00-00 || Win ||align=left| Kim Olsen || 2010 World Combat Games -81 kg/178 lb Muay Thai, Quarter Finals || Beijing, China || Decision (unanimous) || 4 || 2:00
|-  style="background:#cfc;"
| 2010-05-00 || Win ||align=left| Pavel Kharchenko || 2010 IFMA European Championships -81 kg/178 lb, Final || Italy || TKO (cut) || 1 || 0:58
|-
! style=background:white colspan=9 |
|-
| colspan=9 | Legend:

References

External links
 Official Glory profile

1991 births
Living people
Russian male kickboxers
Light heavyweight kickboxers
Cruiserweight kickboxers
Heavyweight kickboxers
Russian Muay Thai practitioners
People from Prokopyevsk
Glory kickboxers
Sportspeople from Kemerovo Oblast